Brava Island may refer to:

 Brava, Cape Verde, an island of Cape Verde
 Brava, Costa Rica, an island of Costa Rica (Isla Brava)